Daria Gavrilova was the defending champion, but lost to Aryna Sabalenka in the second round.

Sabalenka went on to win her first WTA Tour title, defeating Carla Suárez Navarro in the final, 6–1, 6–4. Suárez Navarro reached the final despite playing only one completed match in the first four rounds.

Seeds
The top two seeds received byes into the second round.

Draw

Finals

Top half

Bottom half

Qualifying

Seeds

Qualifiers

Lucky losers

Draw

First qualifier

Second qualifier

Third qualifier

Fourth qualifier

Fifth qualifier

Sixth qualifier

References

External links
Main Draw
Qualifying Draw

Singles